Hey Bro is a 2015 Hindi action comedy film directed by Ajay Chandhok, produced by Vidhi Acharya and Music by Nitz 'N' Sony (Nitin Arora & Sony Chandy) Lyrics by Pranav Vatsa. The film stars Ganesh Acharya,
Maninder Singh, Nupur Sharma and Hanif Hilal. The film was released on 6 March 2015 with mixed to negative reviews.

Plot
Gopi, a villager, goes to Mumbai searching for his mother and twin brother. Finally, when he meets him, he comes to realize that he and his brother have opposing personalities.

Cast 
 Ganesh Acharya as Gopi
 Maninder Singh as Shiv, Gopi's estranged brother who is the head of Mumbai Police Station.
 Nupur Sharma as Anjali
 Hanif Hilal as Baba, A corrupt crime lord Shiv wants to apprehend.
 Indira Krishnan
 Prem Chopra
 Kurush Deboo as Rustom Bandookwalla (Noisy Neighbour)
 Amitabh Bachchan (special appearance in "Birju")
 Govinda (special appearance in "Birju")
 Ajay Devgn (special appearance in "Birju")
 Hrithik Roshan (special appearance in "Birju")
 Akshay Kumar (special appearance in "Birju")
 Ranveer Singh (special appearance in "Birju")
 Aas Mohammad Abbasi as special appearance 
 Prabhudeva (special appearance in "Birju")
 Avi Khairnar (special appearance)
 Mahie Gill as item number "Bulbul"

Soundtrack 

The songs of Hey Bro are composed by Nitz 'N' Sony (Nitin Arora & Sony Chandy), while the lyrics are written by Pranav Vatsa.

Reception  
The film was panned by critics and was declared a "Disaster" by Box Office India .

References

External links 

 

2015 films
2010s Hindi-language films
2010s action comedy-drama films
2015 masala films
Indian action comedy-drama films